Scuola Superiore Guglielmo Reiss Romoli  (SSGRR) was the Telecom Italia’s Post-Graduate International Academy and research centre in information and communication technologies, founded in L'Aquila on 1976 by STET and that concluded its activities in 2009.

History 

The school, named after Guglielmo Reiss Romoli, the first post-war STET general manager, was founded consequently to the need to train the new engineers and executives in the telecommunications industry. SSGRR began its operations in a temporary office in L'Aquila in 1972, while waiting for the construction of its campus in Coppito, near L'Aquila. The school legal status turned to a closed joint-stock company on July 28, 1976, and the official opening of the campus took place in 1977. In 1976 the first director of the school was Luigi Bonavoglia, who successively became president of the school in 1985.

The school was originally intended for post-graduate training of SIP and STET managers and executives. The lecturers were partly internal and partly coming from other companies or from Italian and international universities and research centers, like CSELT. The fields addressed by the training and research activities were both technical in the ICT sector (architecture of telecommunications networks and services, telecommunications infrastructures and technologies, information technology) and managerial (marketing and strategy, organization, regulation).

The SSGRR's scope of work was very wide, because the group was composed of companies ranging from the design of integrated circuits in SGS, to software development and equipment design in Italtel, to telecommunications services operation by SIP. The activities were progressively open to participants from companies outside the STET group, consolidating the role of the school as a center of excellence in the ICT sector.

In 2001 took place the merger by incorporation into SSGRR of other Telecom Italia group's companies dealing with training (Consiel Formazione and Trainet) and of the training centers of Telecom Italia, globally rebranded as Telecom Italia Learning Services (TILS). In July 2006, the spin-off of TILS from the Telecom Italia group took place establishing a new company, TILS Holding, owned by Cegos and Camporlecchio Educational. After several corporate and judicial events, which led to the arrest of the managing director Renzo Bracciali on April 28, 2009, TILS Holding ended its operations in 2009.

Following-up to the shutdown of the company, large part of the staff was re-absorbed in the HR Services subsidiary of Telecom Italia, and the Reiss Romoli brand was taken over by a group of former school employees who relaunched the training activities through a new company, still based in L'Aquila.

Architecture

The design of the ‘Reiss Romoli’ school was carried out by the Antonelli-Greco Studio in Rome, who built a campus inspired to Anglo-Saxon colleges. The structure is characterized by stone walls and made with special anti-seismic criteria. It covers 170 thousand square meters with five tennis courts, one soccer field, a multipurpose facility, a fitness trail, swimming pool and two gyms.

The main body of the building houses all the facilities dedicated to educational activities, such as the classrooms, the auditorium, the library, the laboratories, the publishing centre and the multimedia centre. It also hosts the offices of the school staff. On the right of the central body with respect to the main entrance there is the block of the initial 120 residences, with an additional block of 80 residences to the left.

After the end of school activities and the 2009 L'Aquila earthquake, the campus was used for a while by the University of L'Aquila and remained unused later on.

Activities

The school training activities were mainly based on a residential model, the reason the campus had been built. The organization of the courses was carried out by the internal faculty, with internal lecturers specialized in both technical and managerial areas; they were supported by external lecturers from universities, research centres and companies in the ICT industry. To support the didactic activity, laboratories were available to perform tests and measurements on equipment similar to the ones used in the field by the operators.

The courses were organized both on demand, and on proposal through a catalogue of programs. An example of on demand activity was the Corso di Perfezionamento in Telecomunicazioni (Telecommunications Specialization Course), lasting several months and mandatory for all the newly hired employees of the Telecom Italia group. The catalogue training counted around 250 courses generally lasting one week and addressing information engineering, corporate management and international topics.

In 1996, the school started its e-learning activities. The most significant result in this area was the participation in the SkillPass project in 1999, organized by Sviluppo Italia (a governative development agency), with the training of about 700 participants on skills related to Internet and Web technologies.

Based on the availability of the internal faculty, consultancy activities were also offered both on training projects design and on specialist areas in the technical and managerial fields. All the school's educational activities were ISO 9001 certified, allowing Reiss Romoli to take part in calls for international organizations as well as for the public administration.

Leveraging on the campus infrastructure and the organization of international courses, the school also began to organize domestic and international conferences. A library with books and magazines was available for consultation by the participants.

To support its training activities, the school had a publishing and a multimedia production centre to distribute educational material. The publishing activity was progressively extended to the local printing of the quarterly newsletter Società dell'informazione (Information Society), the proceeding of the conferences held at its premise, and scientific books’ reprints.

Publications

Anastatic reprints

Books

Proceedings

References

Companies based in L'Aquila
Telecom Italia